Lionel Jules Carole (born 12 April 1991) is a French professional footballer who plays as a left back for Turkish club Kayserispor. He is a French youth international, having earned caps at under-17, under-20, and under-21 level.

Club career

Early career 
Carole was born in Montreuil, Seine-Saint-Denis to a French family of Martiniquais descent. His career began with hometown club UJA Alfortville. In 2000, while playing in the club's youth academy, he suffered a debilitating injury to his right eye, after a ball struck him in the face. The injury almost ended the player's career, however, his doctor gave him aerodynamic protective goggles to wear while playing, similar to former Dutch international Edgar Davids.

Nantes 
Carole joined Nantes in 2006 and was, surprisingly, promoted to the senior team by manager Baptiste Gentili for the 2010–11 season, despite not having a professional contract. He made his professional debut on 17 August 2010, in a league match against Évian, appearing as a substitute in a 1–0 defeat. In the team's following match against Laval, Carole started and played the entire match in a 0–0 draw.

Benfica 
On 14 January 2011, it was reported by the French and Portuguese media that Carole would be joining Portuguese club Benfica as a possible replacement for Fábio Coentrão, with the transfer set to occur in June 2011. The following day, Nantes chairman Waldemar Kita and manager Baptiste Gentili stated that they were informed by Carole that he would be signing a professional contract with the club. However, according to Gentili, the player informed him the next day that he would forgo signing a contract with Nantes and had already signed a pre-contract with Benfica. On 25 January, Nantes confirmed that Carole had left the club to sign a five-and-a-half-year deal with Benfica. Nantes was compensated a "training fee" of €750,000 and will acquire 10% of any future fee Benfica receive for the player.

Carole was assigned the number 24 shirt and made his club debut on 13 March 2011, in a league match against Portimonense. He started the match, but was substituted out after halftime in the match, which ended 1–1. In the team's ensuing league match away to Paços de Ferreira, Carole started again and scored an own goal for the hosts. Benfica, however, won the match 5–1. The defender featured in four more league matches in the season, all starts, as Benfica finished the campaign runner-up to champions Porto.

In the 2011–12 season, he was loaned to Sedan FC, acting mainly as a back-up. In the 2012–2013 season, he played for the Benfica B team, being an undisputed starter and playing in 39 official games in the Segunda Liga, acting as centre-back on occasions.

Troyes 
On 9 July 2013, it was announced that Carole would be joining French club Troyes.

Galatasaray 
On 11 July 2015, Carole signed a four-year contract with Turkish club Galatasaray in a €1.5 million transfer fee.

Sevilla (loan) 
On 31 August 2017, Carole joined Spanish club Sevilla on a season-long loan deal with option to buy.

Strasbourg 
In August 2018, Carole returned to France, joining RC Strasbourg Alsace on a three-year contract. The transfer fee paid to Galatasaray was estimated at below €600,000.

International career 
Carole has represented France internationally at under-17 and under-20 level. With the under-17 team, he made his youth international debut on 27 February 2008, in a friendly match against Belgium, appearing as a substitute in a 0–0 draw. That was his only appearance with the team. Carole, subsequently, was not called up to play international football at under-18 or under-19 level. In 2010, after performing well domestically with Nantes, he was called up to represent the under-20 team in preparation for the 2011 FIFA U-20 World Cup. Carole made his debut with the team on 16 November 2010, in a 1–0 victory over Montenegro.

Despite still being eligible to represent France at under-20 level, on 3 February 2011, Carole was named to the under-21 team to play in a friendly match against Slovakia on 8 February. He earned his first under-21 cap and start in the match against Slovakia, playing the entire match in a 3–1 win. Carole returned to the under-20 team in May 2011, appearing in two friendly matches against the United States. In the following month, he appeared in two friendly matches with the under-21 team, before being summoned back to the under-20 team to participate in the 2011 FIFA U-20 World Cup. He made his debut in the competition, appearing as a substitute in the team's 3–1 group stage win over South Korea.

Career statistics

Honours 
Galatasaray
 Turkish Cup: 2015–16
 Turkish Super Cup: 2015, 2016

Notes

References

External links 

 
 
 

1991 births
Living people
French people of Martiniquais descent
Sportspeople from Montreuil, Seine-Saint-Denis
French footballers
Footballers from Seine-Saint-Denis
Association football defenders
France youth international footballers
Villemomble Sports players
US Lusitanos Saint-Maur players
UJA Maccabi Paris Métropole players
FC Nantes players
S.L. Benfica footballers
CS Sedan Ardennes players
S.L. Benfica B players
ES Troyes AC players
Galatasaray S.K. footballers
Sevilla FC players
RC Strasbourg Alsace players
Kayserispor footballers
Ligue 1 players
Ligue 2 players
Primeira Liga players
Liga Portugal 2 players
Süper Lig players
La Liga players
French expatriate footballers
French expatriate sportspeople in Portugal
Expatriate footballers in Portugal
French expatriate sportspeople in Turkey
Expatriate footballers in Turkey
French expatriate sportspeople in Spain
Expatriate footballers in Spain